Kaman may refer to:

 Kaman (surname)
 Kamein (Kaman), an ethnic group in Burma
 Kaman Aircraft, an American aerospace company and helicopter manufacturer
 Kaman Music Corporation, a company of several musical instrument manufacturers
 Kaman Road, a railway station on the Mumbai Suburban Railway in Mumbai, India
 Kamadeva, the Hindu god of human love

Places
 Kaman, Iran, a village in Qazvin Province, Iran
 Kaman, Rajasthan, a city and municipality in the Bharatpur district of Rajasthan, India
 Kaman, Pakistan, town in Punjab, Pakistan
 Kaman (District), Kırşehir, a district of Turkey

See also
 Kamani (disambiguation)